The 1893 Georgia Bulldogs football team represented the Georgia Bulldogs of the University of Georgia during the 1893 college football season. The rivalries with Georgia Tech and Vanderbilt continue to the present day, while the last game played against Furman was played in 1950. Today, the game with Georgia Tech is today known as "Clean, Old-Fashioned Hate."

One of the notable players on the team for the 1893 season was Blanton Winship, a law student at Georgia. Winship played tackle that year only, but went on to become a military lawyer, a veteran of both the Spanish–American War and World War I, the Judge Advocate General of the United States Army and the Governor of Puerto Rico.

Schedule

References

Sources
 
 

Georgia
Georgia Bulldogs football seasons
Georgia Bulldogs football